Love Happy is a 1949 American musical comedy film, released by United Artists, directed by David Miller and starring the Marx Brothers (Groucho Marx, Harpo Marx and Chico Marx) in their 13th and final feature film, as well as a memorable walk-on by a relatively unknown Marilyn Monroe.

The film, produced by former silent film star Mary Pickford, features Groucho Marx in a smaller role than usual, with a supporting cast including Ilona Massey, Vera-Ellen, Paul Valentine, Marion Hutton, Raymond Burr, Bruce Gordon (in his film debut), Eric Blore, and Marilyn Monroe in the aforementioned sequence with Groucho.

The plot was written by Frank Tashlin and Mac Benoff, based on a story by Harpo.

Plot
Private detective Sam Grunion has been searching for the extremely valuable Royal Romanoff diamonds for eleven years, and his investigation leads him to a troupe of struggling performers, led by Mike Johnson, who are trying to put on a musical revue called Love Happy.

Grunion notes that the impoverished young dancers would starve were it not for the sweet, silent Harpo, at Herbert & Herbert, a gourmet food shop that also trafficks in stolen diamonds. Harpo kindly helps ladies with their shopping bags, all the while pilfering their groceries and stuffing them in the pockets of his long trench coat. When the elegant Madame Egelichi arrives, store manager Lefty Throckmorton tells her that "the sardines" have come in. Harpo sneaks into the basement and watches as Lefty lovingly unpacks a sardine can marked with a Maltese cross, and swipes the can from Lefty's pocket, replacing it with an unmarked one. Madame Egelichi, who has gone through eight husbands in three months in her quest for the Romanoff diamonds, is furious when Lefty produces the wrong can. When Lefty remembers seeing Harpo in the basement, she orders him to call the police and offer a $1,000 reward for his capture.

At the theater, meanwhile, unemployed entertainer Faustino the Great asks Mike for a job as a mind-reader, and when Faustino's clever improvisation stops the show's backer, Mr. Lyons, from repossessing the scenery, Mike gratefully hires him. Harpo, who is secretly in love with dancer Maggie Phillips, Mike's girl friend, gives her the sardine can, and she says she will eat them tomorrow. A policeman sees Harpo inside the theater and brings him to Madame Egelichi, who turns Harpo over to her henchmen, Alphonse and Hannibal Zoto. After three days of interrogation, Harpo still refuses to talk, and when he is left alone, he calls Faustino at the theater, using the bike horn he carries in his pocket to communicate. Madame Egelichi listens on the extension as Faustino declares that there are plenty of sardines at the theater, and she goes there at once.

Meanwhile, Mike has just finished telling the troupe that they do not have enough money to open when Madame Egelichi arrives and offers to finance the show. Mike cancels his plans to take Maggie out for her birthday so that he and his new backer can discuss the arrangements. In the alley outside the theater, Harpo, having escaped from Madame Egelichi's suite, finds the diamonds in the sardine can which had been set out for a cat, and puts them in his pocket. When he finds Maggie crying in her dressing room, Harpo takes her to Central Park, where he plays the harp for her and gives her the diamonds as a birthday gift.

On the opening night of the show, Grunion is visited by an agent of the Romanoff family, who threatens to kill him if he does not produce the diamonds in an hour. At the theater, Lefty and the Zoto brothers spy through a window as Maggie puts on the diamond necklace, but Mike asks her not to wear it, promising to buy her an engagement ring instead. As they kiss, Maggie removes the necklace and drops it on the piano strings. The curtain goes up, and when Harpo sees Lefty and the Zoto brothers menacing Maggie, he distracts them with a piece of costume jewelry and leads them up to the roof. Meanwhile, on stage, Faustino plays the piano, and when he strikes the keys forcefully, the diamond necklace flies into the air, drawing the attention of Madame Egelichi, who is watching from the audience. Faustino pockets the diamonds, then rushes to the roof to help Harpo. Madame Egelichi shows up with a gun and demands the necklace, but Faustino gives her the fake diamonds. After tying up Lefty and the Zotos and recovering the real diamonds, Harpo encounters Grunion, who has been hiding on the roof. Harpo drops the diamonds in Grunion's pocket, but then steals them back as Madame Egelichi begins to lead the detective away.

Later, in his office, Grunion comments that Harpo disappeared with the diamonds, never realizing their true value. Grunion interrupts his story to take a phone call from his wife, who turns out to be the former Madame Egelichi.

Cast
 Harpo Marx as Harpo 
 Chico Marx as Faustino the Great 
 Groucho Marx as Detective Sam Grunion 
 Vera-Ellen as Maggie Phillips
 Ilona Massey as Madame Egelichi
 Paul Valentine as Mike Johnson
 Marion Hutton as Bunny Dolan
 Leon Belasco as Mr. Lyons
 Melville Cooper as Lefty Throckmorton
 Raymond Burr as Alphonse Zoto
 Bruce Gordon as Hannibal Zoto
 Eric Blore as Mackinaw
 Marilyn Monroe as Grunion's Client
 Otto Waldis as Ivan (uncredited)

Musical numbers
The film has a musical score and lyrics by Ann Ronell, with a lively film noirish dance version of a Sadie Thompson number. The piece feature's Vera-Ellen and former ballet dancer Paul Valentine as one of the United States Marines on a South Pacific Island.

Chico plays a duet on "Gypsy Love Song" with actor-musician Leon Belasco as Mr. Lyons, the owner of the stage props and costumes. Belasco, on violin, starts playing many fancy trills until Chico says, "Look, Mista Lyons, I know you wanna make a good impression – but please, don't play better than me!" Chico played this same tune in the Marx Bros. first film The Cocoanuts 20 years earlier, in 1929.

Songs

Production
Love Happy was originally conceived as a solo vehicle for Harpo under the title Diamonds in the Sidewalk, Chico, who was usually in need of money due to his lifelong gambling addiction, also became involved in the project. Once Chico was in, financing for the film couldn't be obtained unless all three Marx Brothers were featured, so Groucho agreed to appear in the film.  Love Happy  was the final film to be produced by Mary Pickford.

Groucho appears in the film without his usual greasepaint moustache and eyebrows; by this point in his career, he had grown an actual mustache and no longer saw the greasepaint as necessary. He briefly shares the screen with Harpo (the three never appear together in the same scene) during the climax of the film and mainly provides an encompassing narration to explain things when the necessary sequences for a coherent narrative were unavailable. Groucho avoided mentioning the film at all in his autobiography, Groucho and Me published in 1959, apparently at that time considering A Night in Casablanca (1946) as their last film together. He did acknowledge the film in later interviews for The Marx Brothers Scrapbook (1974) and in his later book, The Groucho Phile: An Illustrated Life (1976). Because of the encapsulated nature of Groucho's scenes, it had long been assumed that his presence in the film was an afterthought. However, recently discovered letters from Groucho show that he was asked to be part of the project from its earliest stages in 1946–47.

The production ran out of money near the end of shooting, so the producers solicited advertising from several companies in order to  complete the film. This unique form of product placement (quite rare at that time) was featured in the rooftop chase around advertising billboards.

Release
Although shooting began in July 1948, the film was not released generally until March 3, 1950. The film's stated copyright is 1949, which is when it was shown in San Francisco on October 12. Originally released at 91 minutes, available non-theatrical prints run 85 minutes and contain some alternate footage with some brief snippets excised from some scenes and some gags completely eliminated. In 2015, Olive Films made the original unedited 91 minute theatrical print available on DVD.

Reception

Critical reception
Love Happy is generally regarded by Marx fans and critics as the weakest of all the Marx Brothers movies in which they were the leads.  (The 1956 film The Story of Mankind is also generally rated very low amongst Marx brothers afficianados, but the brothers only make short individual cameos in that film.)

In its October 8, 1949 front-page editorial, as well as its review of the movie in the same issue, the motion picture trade periodical Harrison's Reports, which always disapproved of any movie showing brand-name products, severely criticized this film for its rooftop chase among billboards promoting Baby Ruth, General Electric, Fisk Tires, Bulova watches, Kool cigarettes, Wheaties and Mobil gasoline.

At the end of his March 8, 1950 episode of his You Bet Your Life radio show, Groucho half-heartedly promotes the film as "Harpo, Chico, and I tell a few jokes and do some acting. It's very educational." In later years, on Today, Groucho dismissed it as a "terrible movie," while speaking of the lasting impression Marilyn Monroe made during her screen test.

References

External links

 
 
 
 
 The Marx Brothers Council Podcast episode discussing Love Happy

1949 films
1949 musical comedy films
American musical comedy films
American black-and-white films
Marx Brothers (film series)
Films directed by David Miller
Films with screenplays by Frank Tashlin
United Artists films
1940s English-language films
1940s American films